Eastern Alamance High School is a public, coeducational high school located in Mebane, North Carolina, United States. It is one of seven high schools in the Alamance-Burlington School System. The school runs on block scheduling from 8:10am to 3:20pm. They are currently running on a 4 block school day with semester long courses. Ninth grade students can choose between eight total classes a year.

Notable alumni
Mercedes Bauzá — former member of the Puerto Rico women's national soccer team
Allen Crowder — former UFC fighter
JamesOn Curry — professional basketball player
Don Kernodle — former pro wrestler with the National Wrestling Alliance
Zack Littell — MLB pitcher
Junior Robinson — professional basketball player

References

Schools in Alamance County, North Carolina
Educational institutions in the United States with year of establishment missing
Public high schools in North Carolina
1962 establishments in North Carolina
Educational institutions established in 1962